Michael Grundt Spang (14 June 1931 – 13 November 2003) was a Norwegian journalist, crime reporter and crime fiction writer. He worked as a journalist for the newspaper Dagbladet from 1955, and for Verdens Gang from 1970. His novel Operasjon V for vanvidd from 1968 was basis for a film from 1970. He was awarded the Riverton Prize in 1985 for his crime novel Spionen som lengtet hjem.

References

1931 births
2003 deaths
People from Mandal, Norway
Dagbladet people
Verdens Gang people
Norwegian crime writers
20th-century Norwegian novelists
Norwegian crime fiction writers
20th-century Norwegian journalists